Powindah may refer to:

Kuchi, nomadic tribesmen found in Afghanistan and Pakistan.  Powindah is a synonymous term used in Pakistani and Indian English
Mullah Powindah, a Pashtun religious leader who died in 1913
Powindah (Dune), a fictional term from Frank Herbert's Dune universe